Una O'Connor (born Agnes Teresa McGlade, 23 October 1880 – 4 February 1959) was an Irish-born American actress who worked extensively in theatre before becoming a character actress in film and in television. She often portrayed comical wives, housekeepers and servants. In 2020, she was listed at number 19 on The Irish Times list of Ireland's greatest film actors.

Life and work
O'Connor was born to a Catholic nationalist family in Belfast, Ireland. Her mother died when she was two; her father was a landowner/ farmer, ensuring that the family always had income from family land. He soon left for Australia and McGlade was brought up by an aunt, studying at St Dominic's School, Belfast, convent schools and in Paris. Thinking she would pursue teaching, she enrolled in the South Kensington School of Art.

Before taking up teaching duties, she enrolled in the Abbey School of Acting (affiliated with Dublin's Abbey Theatre). Her career with the Abbey lasted from 1912 - 1934 where she performed in many productions; these are listed in the Abbey Theatre Archives. She changed her name when she began her acting career with the Abbey Theatre. One of her earliest appearances was in George Bernard Shaw's The Shewing-Up of Blanco Posnet in which she played the part of a swaggering American ranch girl. The production played in Dublin as well as in New York, opening 20 November 1911 at the Maxine Elliott Theatre, marking O'Connor's American debut.

By 1913, she was based in London, where she appeared in The Magic Jug, The Starlight Express (1915-16 at the Kingsway Theatre), and Paddy the Next Best Thing. In the early 1920s, she appeared as a cockney maid in Plus Fours followed in 1924 by her portrayal of a cockney waitress in Frederick Lonsdale's The Fake. In a single paragraph review, an unnamed reviewer noted "Una O'Connor's low comedy hotel maid was effectively handled." The latter show also played in New York (with O'Connor in the cast), opening 6 October 1924 at the Hudson Theatre. A review of the New York performances of The Fake recounts details of the plot, but then mentions
two players of more than ordinary excellence. In the third act of The Fake occurs a scene between Una O'Connor and Godfrey Tearle, with Miss O'Connor as a waitress trying a crude sort of flirtation with Mr. Tearle. He does not respond at all and the longing, the pathos of this servant girl when she has exhausted her charms and receives no encouragement, is the very epitome of what careful character portrayal should be. Miss O'Connor is on the stage for only this single act, but in that short space of time she registers an indelible impression. Rightly, she scored one of the best hits of the performance.

These two plays in which she portrayed servants and waitresses appear to have portended her future career. Returning to London, she played in The Ring o' Bells (November 1925), Autumn Fire (March 1926), Distinguished Villa (May 1926), and Quicksands of Youth (July 1926). When Autumn Fire toured the U.S., opening first in Providence, Rhode Island, a critic wrote: "Una O'Connor, who plays Ellen Keegan, the poor drudge of a daughter, bitter against life and love, does fine work. Her excellence will undoubtedly win her the love of an American public."

She made her first appearance on film in Dark Red Roses (1929), followed by Murder! (1930) directed by Alfred Hitchcock, and an uncredited part in To Oblige a Lady (1931).

Despite her lengthy apprenticeship, she had attracted little attention. British critic Eric Johns recalled meeting her in 1931 in which she confessed: "I don't know what I'm going to do if I don't get work ... The end of my savings is in sight and unless something happens soon, I'll not be able to pay the rent". Her luck changed when she was chosen by Noël Coward to appear in Cavalcade at the Theatre Royal, Drury Lane in 1933. Expressing surprise that Coward noticed her, Coward responded that he had watched her for years and wrote the part with her in mind. She portrayed an Edwardian servant who transforms herself into a self-made woman. When the curtain came down after a performance attended by Hollywood executives, they exclaimed to each other "We must have that Irish woman. That is obvious". Her success led her to reprise her role in the film version of Cavalcade, released in 1933, and with its success, O'Connor decided to remain in the United States.

Among O'Connor's most successful and best remembered roles are her comic performances in James Whale's The Invisible Man (1933) as the publican's wife, and in Bride of Frankenstein (1935) as the Baron's housekeeper. She also appeared two films for director John Ford: The Informer (1935) and The Plough and the Stars (1936). Feeling homesick, in 1937 she returned to London for twelve months in the hope of finding a good part but found nothing that interested her. While in England she appeared in three live BBC Television productions, including a play by Irish playwright Teresa Deevy called In Search of Valour (1939) in which she played the part of Stasia Claremorris. After her return to America, the storage facility that housed her furniture and car was destroyed in one of The Blitz strikes, which she took as a sign to remain in America.

Her film career continued with roles in Michael Curtiz's The Adventures of Robin Hood (1938) and The Sea Hawk (1940); and in Leo McCarey's  The Bells of St. Mary's (1944). She appeared in stage productions in supporting roles and achieved an outstanding success in the role of Janet McKenzie, the nearly deaf housemaid, in Agatha Christie's Witness for the Prosecution at Henry Miller's Theatre on Broadway from 1954 to 1956; she also appeared in the film version in 1957, directed by Billy Wilder. As one of the witnesses, in what was essentially a serious drama, O'Connor's character was intended to provide comic relief. It was her final film performance.

After a break from her initial forays in television, she took up the medium again by 1950. In 1952, she was able to state that she had been in 38 productions that year alone. In a rare article written by O'Connor, she called working in television "the most exacting and nerve-racking experience that has ever come my way. It is an attempt to do two things at once, a combination of stage and screen techniques with the compensations of neither". Observing many actors disliked television work, O'Connor took the opposite view in liking the medium it because it allowed her to play many parts. She lamented that preparation for television work was too short a period for an actor to fully realize the depths of role characterization, but it showed an actor's mettle by the enormous amount of work needed. "Acting talent alone is not enough for the job. It requires intense concentration, an alert-quickmindedness that can take changes in direction at the last minute". O'Connor concluded presciently: "It sounds fantastic and that is just exactly what it is, but it also an expanding field of employment that has come to stay. As such it is more than welcome here, where the living theatre seems determinedly headed the opposite way".

Reportedly she was "happily resigned" to being typecast as a servant. "There's no such thing as design in an acting career. You just go along with the tide. Nine times out of ten one successful part will set you in a rut from which only a miracle can pry you".

Her weak heart was detected in 1932 when her arrival in America began with detention at Ellis Island because of a "congenital heart condition". By the time of her appearance in the stage version of Witness for the Prosecution she had to stay in bed all day, emerging only to get to the theater and then leaving curtain calls early to return to her bed. Her appearance in the film version was intended to be her last.

Critical responses
Eric Johns described O'Connor as

... a frail little woman, with enormous eyes that reminded one of a hunted animal. She could move one to tears with the greatest of ease, and just as easily reduce an audience to helpless laughter in comedies of situation. She was mistress of the art of making bricks without straw. She could take a very small part, but out of the paltry lines at her disposal, create a real flesh-and-blood creature, with a complete and credible life of its own.

She admired John Galsworthy and claimed to have read all his works. 
 
She once said "Acting is a gift from God. It is like a singer's voice. I might quite easily wake up one morning to find that it has been taken from me."

Personal life and death

O'Connor became an American citizen on 3 March 1952. She had been living at the Windsor House at 100 West 58th Street in Manhattan. She died, having never married nor had children, in New York City from heart disease, aged 78, on 4 February 1959 at the Mary Manning Walsh Home. She is interred in Calvary Cemetery in Queens, New York.

Complete filmography

 Dark Red Roses (1929) as Mrs. Weeks
 Murder! (1930) as Mrs. Grogram
 To Oblige a Lady (1931) (uncredited)
 Cavalcade (1933) as Ellen Bridges
 Pleasure Cruise (1933) as Mrs. Signus
 Timbuctoo (1933) as Myrtle
 Horse Play (1933) as Clementia
 Mary Stevens, M.D. (1933) as Mrs. Arnell Simmons
 The Invisible Man (1933) as Jenny Hall
 Orient Express (1934) as Mrs. Peters
 The Poor Rich (1934) as Lady Fetherstone
 All Men Are Enemies (1934) as Annie
 Stingaree (1934) as Annie
 Chained (1934) as Amy, Diane's Maid
 The Barretts of Wimpole Street (1934) as Wilson
 Father Brown, Detective (1934) as Mrs. Boggs
 David Copperfield (1935) as Mrs. Gummidge
 Bride of Frankenstein (1935) as Minnie
 The Informer (1935) as Mrs. McPhillip
 Thunder in the Night (1935) as Julie - Hotel Chambermaid
 The Perfect Gentleman (1936) as Harriet Chatteris
 Rose-Marie (1936) as Anna Roderick
 Little Lord Fauntleroy (1936) as Mary
 Suzy (1936) as Landlady
 Lloyd's of London (1936) as Widow Blake
 The Plough and the Stars (1936) as Mrs. Gogan
 Personal Property (1937) as Clara, Crystal's Maid
 Call It a Day (1937) as Mrs. Milson, the Housekeeper
 The Adventures of Robin Hood (1938) as Bess
 The Return of the Frog (1938) as Mum Oaks
 We Are Not Alone (1939) as Susan O'Connor, Newcome's Maid
 All Women Have Secrets (1939) as Mary
 His Brother's Keeper (1940) as Eva
 It All Came True (1940) as Maggie Ryan
 Lillian Russell (1940) as Marie
 The Sea Hawk (1940) as Miss Latham
 He Stayed for Breakfast (1940) as Doreta
 The Strawberry Blonde (1941) as Mrs. Mulcahey
 Her First Beau (1941) as Effie
 Kisses for Breakfast (1941) as Ellie
 Three Girls About Town (1941) as Maggie O'Callahan
 Always in My Heart (1942) as Angie
 My Favourite Spy (1942) as Cora
 Random Harvest (1942) as Tobacconist
 Forever and a Day (1943) as Mrs. Caroline Ismay
 This Land Is Mine (1943) as Mrs. Emma Lory
 Holy Matrimony (1943) as Sarah Leek
 Government Girl (1943) as Mrs. Harris
 The Canterville Ghost (1944) as Mrs. Umney
 My Pal Wolf (1944) as Mrs. Blevin
 Christmas in Connecticut (1945) as Norah
 The Bells of St. Mary's (1945) as Mrs. Breen
 Cluny Brown (1946) as Mrs. Wilson
 Of Human Bondage (1946) as Mrs. Foreman
 Child of Divorce (1946) as Nora, the Maid
 The Return of Monte Cristo (1946) as Miss Beedle
 Unexpected Guest (1947) as Matilda Hackett
 Lost Honeymoon (1947) as Mrs. Tubbs
 Banjo (1947) as Harriet
 The Corpse Came C.O.D. (1947) as Nora
 Ivy (1947) as Matilda Thrawn
 Fighting Father Dunne (1948) as Miss O'Rourke
 Adventures of Don Juan (1948) as Duenna
 Ha da venì ... don Calogero! (1952) as Angelica, perpetua
 Witness for the Prosecution (1957) as Janet MacKenzie (final film role)

Stage credits
Dates are of the first performance.

Television 

 The Moon in the Yellow River (BBC 1938) as Aunt Columba
 Death at Newtown-Stewart (BBC 1939)
 In Search of Valour (BBC 1939) as Stasia Claremorris

References

Sources

Further reading

External links

 
 
 Una O'Connor at the Abbey Theatre Archive

1880 births
1959 deaths
19th-century Irish people
20th-century Irish actresses
Irish film actresses
Irish stage actresses
Irish television actresses
Actresses from Belfast
Alumni of the Royal College of Art
Irish emigrants to the United States (before 1923)
American film actresses
American television actresses
Burials at Calvary Cemetery (Queens)
People with acquired American citizenship
20th-century American actresses